William Alexander Fraser (24 April 1886 – 26 October 1962) was a Canadian politician.

Fraser was born in Trenton, Ontario where he served as mayor in the 1920s. He represented the riding of Northumberland in Parliament with the Liberal party from 1930 through 1945. He served as Chief Whip in the Mackenzie King government. He was later appointed to the Senate, where he remained until his death in 1962.

Fraser pursued a variety of business interests including the Trenton Cooperage Mills, a major cold storage business, fruit-growing and processing, regional newspapers, movie theatres, and a bridge-building company that later helped manufacture corvettes for the Royal Canadian Navy during World War II. He was known as "Nickel Billy", perhaps in reference to his business skills.

He died at a Kingston, Ontario hospital, aged 76.

References

External links

1886 births
1962 deaths
Canadian senators from Ontario
Liberal Party of Canada MPs
Liberal Party of Canada senators
Mayors of places in Ontario
Members of the House of Commons of Canada from Ontario